Sosnowo  is a village in the administrative district of Gmina Sztabin, within Augustów County, Podlaskie Voivodeship, in north-eastern Poland.

Augustów Canal
The Sosnowo Lock is the second lock on the Augustów Canal (from the Biebrza).

References

Sosnowo